Yevgeny Iosifovich Gabrilovich (29 September 1899 – 5 December 1993) was a Soviet and Russian writer, playwright and screenwriter. He wrote for 29 films between 1936 and 1988.

Selected filmography
 Mashenka (1942)
 Dream (1943)
 Girl No. 217 (1945)
 In the Name of Life (1946)
 The Return of Vasili Bortnikov (1953)
 Lenin in Poland (1966)
 Sofiya Perovskaya (1967)
 No Path Through Fire (1968)
 Monologue (1973)
 A Declaration of Love (1977)
 Lenin in Paris (1981)

Honours and awards
 Hero of Socialist Labour (1979)
 Order of Lenin (1979)
 Order of the October Revolution
 Order of the Red Banner of Labour, twice
 Order of the Patriotic War, 2nd class
 Stalin Prize, 2nd class (1943)   for the screenplay "Mashenka" (1942)
 USSR State Prize, twice
1967  — the script of the film "Lenin in Poland"
1983 — the script of the film "Lenin in Paris"
 National Prize of the German Democratic Republic (1971) — for the film "On the Road to Lenin" (1970)
 Film Award "Nika" (1989)
 People's Artist of the Latvian SSR

References

External links

1899 births
1993 deaths
Writers from Voronezh
People from Voronezhsky Uyezd
20th-century Russian dramatists and playwrights
20th-century Russian male writers
Russian dramatists and playwrights
Russian male writers
20th-century Russian screenwriters
Male screenwriters
Soviet dramatists and playwrights
Soviet male writers
Soviet screenwriters
Moscow State University alumni
Academic staff of the Gerasimov Institute of Cinematography
Academic staff of High Courses for Scriptwriters and Film Directors
Heroes of Socialist Labour
Recipients of the Order of Lenin
Recipients of the Order of the Red Banner of Labour
Stalin Prize winners
Recipients of the USSR State Prize
Recipients of the Nika Award
People's Artists of the Latvian Soviet Socialist Republic
Burials at Novodevichy Cemetery